, abbreviated from the Japanese title of  and currently branded in English as , is a Japanese anime television series, part of The Pokémon Company's Pokémon media franchise, which premiered on TV Tokyo in April 1997.

The anime franchise consists of eight sequential series in Japan, each based on a main installment of the Pokémon video game series. In the international broadcasts, these series are split across 25 seasons, with the 25th season, Ultimate Journeys, streaming on Netflix in the United States (with additional episodes to be released quarterly). The first seven series follow Ash Ketchum, a young trainer of fictional creatures called Pokémon. Joined by his partner Pokémon Pikachu and a rotating cast of human characters, Ash goes on a journey to become a "Pokémon Master", travelling through the various regions of the Pokémon world and competing in various Pokémon-battling tournaments known as the Pokémon League. An eighth anime series, featuring a new cast, will follow Liko and Roy.

The anime series is accompanied by spin-off programming; including Pokémon Chronicles, a series of side stories; and the live-action variety and Pokémon-related news shows; such as Pocket Monsters Encore, Weekly Pokémon Broadcasting Station, Pokémon☆Sunday, Pokémon Smash!, Pokémon Get☆TV and Meet Up at the Pokémon House?

The Pokémon anime series was largely credited for allowing anime to become more popular and familiar around the world, especially in the United States, where many Pokémon films are among the highest-grossing anime films. It is also considered to be one of the first anime series on television to reach this level of mainstream success with Western audiences, as well as being credited with allowing the game series to reach such a degree of popularity and vice versa. Pokémon is regarded as the most successful video game adaptation of all time, with over 1,200 episodes broadcast and adapted for international television markets, concurrently airing in 192 countries worldwide and one of the most widely watched shows on Netflix, as of 2016.

Plot and characters

Pocket Monsters (1997–2002)

The Beginning (1997–1999)
Ash Ketchum, a young boy from Pallet Town, comes of age and gains the right to train Pokémon; trainers receive their first Pokémon from Professor Oak, the town's foremost authority on researching Pokémon. Ash dreams of becoming the Pokémon Master. Though Ash oversleeps and arrives late to Professor Oak's lab, he receives a Pikachu, who is initially uncooperative. On their way to Viridian City, Ash earns Pikachu's friendship by selflessly shielding him from a group of angry Spearow. While Pikachu's injuries are treated in Viridian City's Pokémon Center, Ash is confronted by Misty, a girl whose bike he desperately stole and wrecked in his attempt to escape the Spearow; she declares that she will not leave Ash's side until she is properly compensated. Suddenly, a trio of criminals from the organization Team Rocket — Jessie, James, and Meowth — appear to steal Pokémon from the Center. Pikachu overpowers them, which convinces the trio of his teamwork value and inspires numerous subsequent attempts to steal him. To compete in the Pokémon League tournament, Ash must defeat Gym Leaders and earn badges as evidence of his victories. Ash earns his first badge in Pewter City by defeating the Gym Leader Brock, who decides to venture with him. Together with Brock and Misty, Ash travels across the Kanto region, defeating Gym Leaders, collecting their badges, and capturing new Pokémon. After collecting all eight badges, Ash participates in the Indigo League; he reaches the top 16 before losing to his friend Richie.

Upon Ash's return to Pallet Town, Professor Oak asks him to go to Professor Ivy in the Orange Islands to collect a GS Ball, a mysterious Poké Ball that cannot be opened. Brock stays with Professor Ivy as an assistant, and Ash decides to defeat the Gym Leaders of the Orange Islands and qualify for the local tournament. Ash and Misty are joined by artist Tracey Sketchit, who dreams of meeting Professor Oak. Ash faces and defeats the tournament champion Drake before returning to Pallet Town. Tracey stays with Professor Oak as an assistant and Brock reunites with his friends.

Gold and Silver (1999–2002)
Ash goes to the Johto region after learning that Gary has gone there as well. Ash defeats the Gym Leaders of Johto and competes in the Johto League. Ash defeats Gary and causes him to reconsider his purpose in life. After advancing to the quarter-finals, Ash loses to a trainer named Harrison, who informs Ash of the Hoenn region. As Ash goes back to Pallet Town, Misty receives word from her sisters that they are leaving on a world tour and have entrusted the Cerulean City Gym to her. Brock's family has also asked him to return. Ash leaves all his Pokémon (excluding Pikachu) in Professor Oak's lab, and he travels to Hoenn alone.

Advanced Generation / Ruby and Sapphire (2002–2006)
Brock follows Ash to Hoenn and Ash gains two new companions, a Pokémon Coordinator May and her younger brother Max. Together, they go on another adventure. May collects five ribbons to participate in the Hoenn Grand Festival, but she loses to Drew in the Hoenn Grand Festival, placing her in the Top 8, and Robert takes the Hoenn Grand Festival Ribbon Cup. Ash defeats all eight Hoenn gym leaders and participates in the Hoenn League, but he loses to Tyson, in the quarterfinals, placing him in the Top 8. Tyson becomes the Winner in the Ever Grande Conference.

Ash continues his journey with Brock, May and Max in Kanto. Ash gets seven frontier symbols and wins the Battle Frontier. However, Ash declines the offer to be a Frontier Brain, and decides to continue his Pokémon journey. May collects five ribbons to participate in Kanto Grand Festival but she loses to Solidad in the Kanto Grand Festival, placing her in the Top 4, and Solidad takes the Kanto Grand Festival Ribbon Cup. Afterwards, Ash battles with his rival, Gary. After seeing Electivire, a Pokémon from the Sinnoh region he has never seen before, Ash decides to travel to Sinnoh.

Diamond and Pearl (2006–2010)
Upon arrival in Sinnoh, Ash and Brock meet Dawn, another Pokémon Coordinator, who travels with them as they go through the Sinnoh region in another adventure. Dawn earns five ribbons to participate in the Sinnoh Grand Festival. There, Dawn loses to Zoey, placing her second, and Zoey takes the Sinnoh Grand Festival Ribbon Cup. Ash defeats all eight Sinnoh gym leaders to participate in the Sinnoh League, Paul loses to Ash in the quarterfinal, then Ash loses to Tobias in the semifinals, placing him in the Top 4 and Tobias became winner of Lily of the Valley Conference.

Best Wishes! / Black & White (2010–2013)
Afterwards, Ash, his mother Delia and Professor Oak take a holiday to the far-off Unova Region, where he meets and travels with would-be Dragon Master Iris and Striaton City Gym Leader, Pokémon Connoisseur, and sometimes detective Cilan. After winning all eight Unova badges and thwarting the sinister Team Plasma, Ash, Iris, and Cilan travel throughout the eastern side of Unova to prepare for the Unova League, but Ash loses to Cameron, in the quarterfinals, placing him in the Top 8. But also, Cameron loses to Virgil in the semifinals, placing him in the Top 4. 

Afterwards, Ash, Iris, and Cilan travel through the Decolore Islands before Ash makes his way back to Pallet Town and meets the investigative reporter Alexa, who is from the distant Kalos Region. Having arrived back in Kanto, Iris and Cilan travel to Johto whilst Ash and Alexa head to Kalos.

XY (2013–2016)
Ash and Alexa arrive in the Kalos region and Ash is itching to get started in earning his Gym badges. But after Alexa informs Ash that her sister, a Gym Leader, is currently absent, Ash travels to Lumiose City where he meets boy-genius Clemont and his younger sister Bonnie, unaware that Clemont is, in fact, Lumiose City's Gym Leader; a fact he tries his best to hide. Ash also reunites with Serena, a girl from Vaniville Town whom Ash had met in his childhood. Serena earns three keys to participate in the Pokémon Showcase. Serena loses to Aria, placing her runner-up. After traveling with Serena, Clemont, and Bonnie to prepare for the Kalos League by defeating all eight Kalos gym leaders, Ash competes and advances all the way to the finals, where he loses to Alain, placing him runner-up. Alain was a temporary member of the evil Team Flare due to them misleading him. Once he discovers their true intentions, Alain reforms and joins Ash and his friends to stop Team Flare's plans. Bidding farewell to his friends in Kalos, Ash once again returns to Pallet Town.

Sun & Moon (2016–2019)
Ash, Delia and her Mr. Mime are on vacation in the Alola region when Ash has an encounter with Tapu Koko, the guardian Pokémon of Melemele Island, who presents him with the Z-Ring, a device that, when paired with a special crystal, allows a Pokémon to unleash a powerful move when synchronized with its trainer. This leads him to stay in Alola and enroll at the local Pokémon school. When he decides to undertake the trials necessary to master the power of the Z-Ring, Ash's new classmates Lana, Mallow, Lillie, Sophocles and Kiawe decide to accompany him. Ash takes part in the island challenges, and finally gains his first official league victory at the Alola League.

Pocket Monsters / Journeys (2019–2023)
Pikachu's backstory as a Pichu, Ash's story of when he was 6 years old missing Professor Oak's camp, Goh's backstory when he was 6 years old and attended Professor Oak's camp and saw a Mew, are all told. Ash and Pikachu travel to each of the regions, accompanied by Goh as Research fellow. Ash wants to defeat Leon and Goh wants to catch each and every Pokémon including Mew. Chloe sometimes joins Ash and Goh on their adventure with her newly caught Eevee, who is incapable of evolving. Goh took part in trial missions of a research project "Project Mew" to be a Chaser and find Mew. Ash defeated Leon in the final round of Pokémon World Coronation Series: Masters Eight Tournament and became Pokémon World Champion. Goh and other members of Project Mew travel to Faraway Island to find Mew, they encountered Mew which Goh befriends Mew instead of catching it. With their goals are accomplished, Ash and Goh departs separate ways. 

Ash and Pikachu resume their travels then they reunites Misty and Brock and decide to travel with them again.

Pocket Monsters (2023)

The series features dual protagonists Liko and Roy, along with the three Paldea starter Pokémon as they adventure through the Pokémon world.

Episodes

In Japan, Pocket Monsters is currently broadcast as seven sequential series, each based on an installment of the main video game series. The anime is aired year-round continuously, with regular off-days for sporting events and television specials. In its international broadcast, Pokémons episodes have currently been split up into 25 seasons, as of 2022, running a fixed number of episodes, using a specific opening sequence and sporting a different subtitle for each new season.

The seventh and current installment of the anime series is titled  in Japan and Pokémon Journeys: The Series internationally; Pokémon Journeys: The Series, its first season, first ran from November 17, 2019 to December 4, 2020 in Japan, the next season Pokémon Master Journeys: The Series, first ran from December 11, 2020 to December 10, 2021 in Japan. The third and final season, Pokémon Ultimate Journeys: The Series premiered its first episode in Japan on December 17, 2021.

Specials

In addition to the main series and the movies, the anime series has also shown various full-length specials and TV shorts. Many of these specials centered around legendary Pokémon or one or more of the main characters that are separate from the main cast during its corresponding series, while the sporadically-made later side story episodes typically air as special episodes.

Films

, there have been 23 animated films and one live action film. The first nineteen animated films are based on the television series, with the original film being remade into the 22nd. The 20th, 21st and 23rd animated films are set in an alternate continuity to the anime. The films are produced by the animation studios OLM, Production I.G, Xebec, and Wit Studio, and distributed in Japan by Toho, with various studios distributing the films in North America. They were directed by Kunihiko Yuyama and Tetsuo Yajima, and written by Takeshi Shudo, Hideki Sonoda, Atsuhiro Tomioka, Shōji Yonemura, Eiji Umehara, and Aya Takaha.

Spin-off

Pokémon Chronicles

Pokémon Chronicles is a label created by 4Kids which is used for a collection of several as yet undubbed specials, which were first broadcast in English between May and October 2005 in the UK, and in the US between June and November 2006. The remaining portions of Chronicles consisted of a TV special called The Legend of Thunder, and installments from Pikachu's Winter Vacation, originally released on video.

Japanese variety shows

Pocket Monsters Encore
 was broadcast on TV Tokyo from October 19, 1999 to September 17, 2002. It ran during the second part of the original series. Pocket Monsters Encore is a variety show featuring reruns of old episodes, including Japanese and English audio tracks,  except for EP035 and EP018, which were broadcast in stereo. EP022 and EP023 broadcast together. EP018 was taken out of sequence and inserted between Holiday Hi-Jynx and Snow Way Out!, which were broadcast in the place of EP038 and EP039. EP052 aired between EP047 and EP048 and EP053 between EP057 and EP058. The ending song is the English version of Type: Wild performed by Robbie Danzie, and it was produced for Pocket Monsters Encore and aired.

 was a segment at the end of Pocket Monsters Encore used to teach Japanese children simple English words and phrases. All of the segments where later compiled into three volumes and later released. 

Pokémon de English uses a mixture of unedited Japanese and painted-over English video. New English lines were also recorded for this release by the original voice actors from both Japan and the United States. Pokémon de English was later released as rental only VHS and DVDs in 2002 and 2007, respectively, including English audio, as well as closed captioning in both English and Japanese. 

On September 17, 2002, it was replaced by Weekly Pokémon Broadcasting Station.

Weekly Pokémon Broadcasting Station
 is a closely related spin-off series that aired during the final part of the original series, and continues during the beginning part of Pokémon: Advanced Generation. The show was presented as an animated variety show, and showed clip shows, reruns of Pokémon episodes, television airings of the Pokémon movies, cast interviews, and live action footage, in addition to the previously mentioned Pokémon side story episodes. The hosts were Mayumi Iizuka as Kasumi (Misty) and Yūji Ueda as Takeshi (Brock). They were regularly joined by Kaba-chan, Manami Aihara, Bernard Ackah and Rex Jones as the comedy team "Shio Koshō", Megumi Hayashibara as Musashi (Jessie), Shin-ichiro Miki as Kojirō (James), and Inuko Inuyama as Nyāsu (Meowth). The show ran from October 15, 2002, to September 28, 2004, when it was replaced by Pokémon☆Sunday.

Pokémon☆Sunday

 was broadcast on TV Tokyo from October 3, 2004, to September 26, 2010. The show is the successor to the Pocket Monsters Encore and the Weekly Pokémon Broadcasting Station. It ran from the second part of Pokémon: Advanced Generation to Pokémon: Diamond & Pearl. Like the shows before it, Pokémon☆Sunday is variety show featuring reruns of old episodes as well as a number of 'Research' episodes involving live-action elements. Regular guests include Golgo Matsumoto and Red Yoshida of TIM; Hiroshi Yamamoto, Ryūji Akiyama, and Hiroyuki Baba of Robert; Becky (through September 2006), and Shoko Nakagawa (starting October 2006).

Pokémon Smash!
 is the successor to the Pokémon☆Sunday series. It aired from October 3, 2010, to September 28, 2013. Like its predecessors, Pokémon Smash! is a variety show that features live-action segments and reruns of old anime episodes. It ran during Pokémon: Best Wishes Season 1 and Season 2. The theme song is "Endless Fighters" by AAA. Regular guests include Golgo Matsumoto and Red Yoshida of TIM; Shoko Nakagawa; and Hiroshi Yamamoto, Ryūji Akiyama, and Hiroyuki Baba of Robert.

Pokémon Get☆TV
 is the successor to Pokémon Smash! It aired from October 6, 2013 to September 27, 2015. Shoko Nakagawa remains as a host, and is joined by Yukito Nishii and comedy team Taka and Toshi. Just like its predecessors, it is a variety show featuring reruns of previous anime episodes and special live-action segments. It ran during Pokémon: XY.

Meet Up at the Pokémon House?
Meet Up at the Pokémon House? (ポケモンの家あつまる？ Pokémon no Uchi Atsumaru?), more commonly known as Pokénchi (Japanese: ポケんち) or Pokémon House (Japanese: ポケモンの家), is the successor to Pokémon GET☆TV, it aired from October 4, 2015 to March 29, 2022. It is hosted by Shōko Nakagawa, Rinka Ōtani, Hyadain, and Abareru-kun, making it the first variety show not to have reruns of previous anime episodes, unlike its predecessors. It ran during Pokémon: XY, Pokémon: Sun & Moon and Pokémon: The New Series.

Where are we going with Pokémon!?
Where are we going with Pokémon!? (ポケモンとどこいく！？, Pokémon to doko iku!?), more commonly known as Poké Doko (ポケどこ, Poké Doko), is the successor to Meet Up at the Pokémon House?, which premiered on April 3, 2022 during Pokémon: The New Series. It is hosted by Shōko Nakagawa, Ryōgo Matsumaru, Abareru-kun, and Hikaru Takahashi, and it will focus on their travels.

Airing and production
Pokémon premiered in Japan on TV Tokyo on April 1, 1997. The series is broadcast on the TX Network family of stations first on Thursday evenings; it is then syndicated throughout the rest of Japan's major broadcasters (All-Nippon News Network, Fuji Network System, Nippon Television Network System) on their local affiliates as well as on private satellite and cable networks on various delays. Production in Japan is handled by TV Tokyo, MediaNet (formerly TV Tokyo MediaNet and Softx), and ShoPro (formerly Shogakukan Productions). Kunihiko Yuyama has served as the series' chief director since the original series. The previous series, Pokémon: Sun & Moon, began broadcast in Japan on November 17, 2016, with Tetsuo Yajima serving as director and Atsuhiro Tomioka as head screenwriter. The anime had made millions of dollars in Japan when it first aired. An average Pokémon episode costs about $100,000.

Internationally, The Pokémon Company International handles production and distribution of the anime with Iyuno Media Group and Goldcrest Post and published by VIZ Media, who was VIZ LLC, but merged with ShoPro. The anime currently airs in 192 countries. In the United States, the anime aired on Kids' WB as a Saturday morning cartoon in 1999. In its first week under the Kids' WB umbrella, Pokémon would manage to hit a 3.9 rating (a percentage of how much a specific demographic of people is watching), reaching  viewers by September, and Nielsen stating that "half the boys (ages 6-11) watching TV (at 10 a.m.) are seeing Pokémon" by that November.

Beginning in 2020, Netflix gained the exclusive rights to stream new episodes in the United States; the twenty-third season, titled Pokémon Journeys: The Series debuted on June 12, 2020  and ended on March 5, 2021 with its fourth twelve episode batch., and continues with the twenty-fourth season, titled Pokémon Master Journeys: The Series, debuted on the service on September 10, 2021. The series has previously aired in syndication, with new episodes premiering on Kids' WB, Cartoon Network, and Disney XD. In the US, library episodes also aired on Cartoon Network in the Kids' WB years starting in 2002 and Boomerang in the Cartoon Network years starting in 2010 and have aired in Spanish on TeleXitos and Discovery Familia.

Pokémon was originally licensed in the United States by 4Kids Entertainment, who produced a localized English adaptation that was syndicated by The Summit Media Group. The localized version premiered in first run syndication on September 8, 1998, twenty days before the North American release of Pokémon Red and Blue. Pokémon was distributed on VHS and DVD by Pioneer Entertainment and Viz Video, which sold 25million units of the series in 2000. Following the eighth season in 2005, the series' dub production was taken over by The Pokémon Company. Beginning with twelfth film, Arceus and the Jewel of Life, DuArt Film and Video became the production studio, which lasted until the twenty-second season.

OLM, Inc. served as producer. Until episode 259 (episode 262 in Japan), during the fifth season, the series was animated using cel animation. Beginning with episode 260 (episode 263 in Japan), titled "Here's Lookin' at You Elekid!", all subsequent seasons are digitally animated.

In a 2018 interview, the creators of Detective Pikachu, which features a talking Pikachu, revealed that the original intention for the anime was to have the Pokémon talk, but OLM, Inc. was unable to come up with a concept that Game Freak were accepting of.

The following table lists the annual content revenue from Pokémon anime media in Japan, as reported by market research firm Hakuhodo.

Streaming and digital
Pokémon is currently available for streaming on Netflix in 216 regions and countries with different dubs and subtitles; all countries have at least English audio. Pokémon was globally one of the most widely watched shows on Netflix, as of 2016. It is also available on Hulu (in the United States and Japan), and Amazon Prime Video (in the United States, United Kingdom, Japan, Germany, and Austria). From when the series made its home on Disney XD, as much as every in-circulation episode was available on Watch Disney XD and later DisneyNOW in the United States until February 2022. Netflix removed the Sun & Moon series, I Choose You!, and The Power of Us at the end of March 2022, leaving only the first season and the seasons and movies they exclusively released. Content is also available on the Pokémon TV app and website.

Reception

Critical reception
In a February 2008 review for IGN, Jeffrey Harris gave the Indigo League series a score of 2 out of 10, saying: "Ultimately, the show's story is boring, repetitive, and formulaic. The show constantly preaches about friendship and helping others. ... Nearly every episode features Ash, Misty, and Brock on a trip. Team Rocket tries the latest scheme to catch Pikachu or whatever else, and fails miserably." He concluded: "at the end of the day, this franchise feels more like crass marketing  trying to preach the importance of friend and companionship." In an April 2008 review, Common Sense Media gave the series 3 out of 5 stars, saying: "Over the years, the energetic, imagination-filled, Japanese-inspired fantasy series has cut across cultural, gender, and age barriers to captivate a global audience of girls, boys, and even adults", but added: "Folks may also find the franchise's massive commercial appeal disturbing, especially since the show is mainly geared towards kids."

Carl Kimlinger, in an August 2008 review of the Diamond and Pearl series for Anime News Network, gave the dubbed series an overall grade of C. He wrote: "The formula has been set in stone … Ash and buddies wander around, meet a new  or  trainer, fight, make friends, and then use their newfound Power of Friendship to stave off an attack by the nefarious Team Rocket", and added: "even the tournaments are a relief, a blessed pause in the cerebrum-liquefying formula as Ash and company square off against destined rivals for an episode or two." However, he stated that it would be enjoyed by its target audience, saying: "It's colorful, silly and lively (if insanely simplistic and cheap)" and added: "Parents will appreciate the absolute lack of objectionable content (aside from the promotion of animism) and the series' impeccably PC message of friendship, cooperation and acceptance". He criticized the series' soundtrack as "tin-eared" and "bad video game music".

Kevin McFarland, in a 2016 binge-watching guide of the Indigo League series for Wired, described the series as "a kids program that emphasizes the value of hard work, the importance of family and close friendship, and the ideals of love, trust, and honor. But it's also a largely silly show with slapstick comedy and colorful battle sequences, making Ash's Sisyphean task to become the world’s best Pokémon trainer continually entertaining."

Paste ranked the series at 44th place in its October 2018 list of "The 50 Best Anime Series of All Time", with Sarra Sedghi writing: "To the joy of ’90s kids everywhere, Pokémon helped solidify anime (and, hopefully, good punnery) in the West". She added: "Pokémon may not be high artistry (because, you know, it’s for children), but the show’s pervasiveness is a testament to the power of nostalgia." IGN ranked the series at 70th place in its list of "Top 100 Animated Series", saying that the series "had clever writing and a golden marketing formula designed to spread Nintendo's Pokémon videogames into new, lucrative territory."

Controversies

Pokémon has had several anime episodes removed from the rotation in Japan or the rest of the world. The episode made headlines worldwide when it caused 685 children to experience seizures and seizure-like symptoms caused by a repetitive flash of light. Although the offending sequence was caused by Pikachu's actions, the episode's featured Pokémon, Porygon, has rarely been seen in future episodes, with appearances limited to one brief cameo appearance in the movie Pokémon Heroes and in one scene-bumper later in season 1. Its evolutions Porygon2 and Porygon-Z have only appeared in a brief part of the opening sequence of Pokémon the Movie: Kyurem vs. the Sword of Justice. Several other episodes have been removed from broadcast in Japan due to contemporary disasters that resemble events in the program; the 2004 Chūetsu earthquake, the 2011 Tōhoku earthquake and tsunami, and the 2014 Sinking of MV Sewol all have caused cancellations or indefinite or temporary postponements of episode broadcasts. In the United States, the September 11 attacks in 2001 as well as 2005's Hurricane Katrina led to the temporary removal of two episodes from syndication.

On September 1, 2006, China banned the series from prime time broadcasting (from 17:00 to 20:00), as it did Western animated series such as The Simpsons, to protect its struggling animation studios. The ban was later extended by one hour.

On August 18, 2016, the XYZ episode  (Down to the Fiery Finish! in the English dub) faced criticism from fans when Ash lost the Kalos League against Alain. The fans specifically criticized the episode due to the misleading name and trailers that suggested that Ash would win the battle and because Ash had lost all of the Pokémon Leagues in past seasons. Fans also disliked the outcome because they believed Ash's Greninja had many advantages over Alain's Charizard, including the fact that Water-type Pokémon resist Fire-type Pokémon attacks, and that the rare Bond Phenomenon Ash's Greninja was subject to was said to be far more powerful than a conventional Mega Evolution.  Several animators of the series also expressed disappointment that Ash had lost. TV Tokyo's YouTube upload of the teaser of the next episode received an overwhelming number of dislikes as a result of the outcome.

Influence
The series is considered to be one of the first anime series on television to reach this level of mainstream success with Western audiences. It has also been credited with allowing the game series to reach a high degree of popularity, and vice versa.

See also

 List of television programs based on video games

Notes

References

Further reading
 - Displays the dubbing process done by Sarah Natochenny

External links
 Official website
 Pokémon seasons
 Pokémon anime website at TV Tokyo 
 Pokémon TV Anime at Pokémon JP official website 
 

1997 Japanese television series debuts
Adventure anime and manga
Animated television series about children
Anime television series based on video games
Comedy anime and manga
Cryptozoological television series
Fantasy anime and manga
Japanese children's animated adventure television series
Japanese children's animated comedy television series
Japanese children's animated fantasy television series
Netflix original anime
Pokémon anime
Television censorship in the United States
TV Tokyo original programming
Viz Media anime